is a Japanese real estate company and one of the largest builders of condominiums in the country.

References

External links 
 Daikyo Incorporated company English website 

Real estate companies established in 1964
Construction and civil engineering companies established in 1964
Construction and civil engineering companies based in Tokyo
Real estate companies based in Tokyo
Midori-kai
Companies listed on the Tokyo Stock Exchange
Japanese companies established in 1964